USA Water Ski created a hall of fame in 1982. It is now part of the Water Ski Experience Hall of Fame and Museum in Polk City, Florida.

1980s
1982
Willa Cook, DeLeon Springs, Florida, 
Ralph Samuelson, deceased, 
Dick Pope Sr., deceased, 
Chuck Stearns, Huntington Beach, California, 
Dan B. Hains, deceased, 
Charles R. Sligh, deceased, 
Liz Allan Reid, Godfrey, Illinois, 

1983
Jack Anderson, Hewitt, New Jersey, 
Pruce Parker, deceased, 
Leland G. Sutherland, deceased, 
William P Barlow, deceased, 
Don Ibsen, deceased, 

1984
Charles Tilgner, deceased, 
Fred Wiley, deceased, 
Warren Witherell, deceased, Bolton Landing, New York, 

1986
Wayne Grimditch, Lighthouse Point, Florida, 
Barbara Cooper Heddon, Haines City, Florida, 

1987
Mike Suyderhoud, Redding, California, 
Joe Cash, deceased, 

1988
Ricky McCormick, Winter Haven, Florida, 

1989
William D. Clifford, deceased, 
Dick Pope Jr., deceased, Winter Haven, Florida, Hall of Fame Induction Entry

1990s
1990
Jack Walker, N. Miami Beach, Florida,  

1991
Linda Leavengood Giddens, Eastman, Georgia, 
George Blair, Winter Haven, Florida, 

1992
Stew McDonald, deceased,  
Nancie Rideout Robertson, deceased,  

1993
William P. Barlow Jr., Oakland, California, 
Tommy Bartlett, deceased,  
Cindy Todd, Pierson, Florida,  

1994
Al Tyll, Boynton Beach, Florida, 
Karin Roberge Woodson, Melbourne, Florida,  

1995
Lisa St. John, Orlando, Florida,  
Larry Penacho, Jamul, California,  

1996
Skip Gilkerson, Maryville, Tennessee 

1997
C.W. Lowe, Winter Haven, Florida 
Carole Lowe, Winter Haven, Florida,  

1998
Mike Osborn, Winter Haven, Florida,  
Alan Kempton, Tampa, Florida,  

1999
Lori Powell-Drell, Cummings, Georgia,  
Jeffry Armstrong, Grenada, Mississippi,

2000s
2000
Deena Brush Mapple, Orlando, Florida,  
Mike Seipel, Atlantis, Florida, 

2001
Sammy Duvall, Orlando, Florida, 

2002 
Mike Avila, Pacifica, California, 
Jennifer Calleri-Schwenk, Winter Haven, Florida, 

2003
Camille Duvall-Hero, New York City, 

2004
Tory Baggiano, Alexandria, Virginia, 

2005
Dave Reinhart, Defiance, Ohio, 

2006 
Bob LaPoint, Truckee, CA, 
Carl Roberge, Montreal, Quebec, Canada, 

2007
Scotty Clack, Winter Haven, FL, 
Britt Larsen-Kovak, Cambridge, Ontario, 
Tawn Larsen-Hahn, Southport, CT, 

2008
Marsha Fitzgerald,  Concord, NC, 
Kris LaPoint, Orlando, FL, 

2009
 Lucky Lowe, Lake Alfred, FL, 
 Lynn Novakofski, Winter Haven, FL, 

2010
 Darin Shapiro, Orlando, FL, 

2011

 Debbie Nordblad, Long Beach, California, Hall of Fame Induction Entry
 Ron Scarpa, Winter Haven, FL, Hall of Fame Induction Entry

2012

 Sherri Slone, Hays, KS, Hall of Fame Induction Entry
 Wade Cox, Orlando, FL, Hall of Fame Induction Entry

2013

 Cory Pickos, Santa Rosa Beach, FL, Hall of Fame Induction Entry
 Jim Grew, Hall of Fame Induction Entry
 Kristi Overton-Johnson, Keystone Heights, FL, Hall of Fame Induction Entry

2014

 Cheryl Orloff, Hall of Fame Induction Entry

2015

 Bill Bowness, Hall of Fame Induction Entry
 Jennifer Leachman LaPoint, Windermere, FL, Hall of Fame Induction Entry
 Kim Laskoff, Orlando, FL, Hall of Fame Induction Entry

External links

Sports hall of fame inductees
Water Skiing Hall of Fame
Halls of fame in Florida
Water skiers